Douglas Archibald Campbell  (13 December 1906 – 7 March 1969) was a New Zealand teacher and soil conservator. He was born in Dunedin, New Zealand, on 13 December 1906.

Campbell graduated from Canterbury Agricultural College (now Lincoln University) with a Master's degree on red clover in 1930.

In 1967, Campbell was awarded the Bledisloe Medal by the Canterbury Agricultural College. In the 1968 New Year Honours, he was appointed a Companion of the Imperial Service Order.

References

1906 births
1969 deaths
Schoolteachers from Dunedin
New Zealand conservationists
New Zealand Companions of the Imperial Service Order
New Zealand public servants